Joseph Worsley (born June 16, 1997) is an American volleyball player, a member of the German club SVG Lüneburg, a silver medalist of the 2019 NORCECA Championship.

His younger brother Gage, also a volleyball player, plays the libero position.

Sporting achievements 
Big West Conference:
  2018, 2019
NCAA men's tournament:
  2019

National Team 
Boys' Youth NORCECA Championship:
  2014
Men's Junior NORCECA Championship:
  2016
NORCECA Championship:
  2019

References

External links
TeamUSA profile
HawaiiAthletics profile
Volleybox profile

1997 births
Living people
American men's volleyball players
Sportspeople from California
American expatriate sportspeople in Germany
Expatriate volleyball players in Germany
People from Moraga, California
Hawaii Rainbow Warriors volleyball players
Setters (volleyball)